is a Japanese daily newspaper published mainly in Akita prefecture. The company is based in Akita, Akita.　The newspaper is dominant in its region, with a market penetration approaching 54 percent of Akita Prefecture households.

History
The Ugo Shimbun was established on March 28, 1873 in Akita and was founded by its editor, Ryochi Karino. In August, the newspaper changed its name to Kaji Shimbun. From October 2008, the evening edition was discontinued.

Sakigake Group affiliate companies
Akita Broadcasting System (10%)
Akita Television (6.41%)
FM Akita (24.66%)

Gallery

References

Location map

1873 establishments in Japan
Japanese-language newspapers
Daily newspapers published in Japan
Mass media in Akita (city)